This Acting Business is a 1933 British comedy film directed by John Daumery and starring Hugh Williams, Wendy Barrie and Donald Calthrop.

It was made at Teddington Studios as a quota quickie by the British subsidiary of Warner Brothers.

Cast
 Hugh Williams as Hugh 
 Wendy Barrie as Joyce 
 Donald Calthrop as Milton Stafford 
 Violet Farebrother as Mary Kean 
 Marie Wright as Mrs. Dooley 
 Charles Paton as Ward

References

Bibliography
 Chibnall, Steve. Quota Quickies: The Birth of the British 'B' Film. British Film Institute, 2007.
 Low, Rachael. Filmmaking in 1930s Britain. George Allen & Unwin, 1985.
 Wood, Linda. British Films, 1927-1939. British Film Institute, 1986.

External links

1933 films
British comedy films
1933 comedy films
Films directed by Jean Daumery
Quota quickies
Films shot at Teddington Studios
Warner Bros. films
British black-and-white films
1930s English-language films
1930s British films